Bernd Aldenhoff (14 June 1908, in Duisburg – 8 October 1959, in München) was a German Heldentenor.

Career
He was born in 1908 in Duisburg, and raised in an orphanage in the Rhineland. Despite his humble beginnings, he managed to secure an engagement in the Cologne Opera chorus. While in Cologne he continued his vocal studies with a Professor Lenz, and was eventually promoted to soloist in the Cologne theater.

After engagements in Darmstadt and Erfurt, he first came to national prominence at the Deutsche Oper am Rhein, Düsseldorf, where he sang from 1938 to 1944. During this period he made several guest appearances at the Oper Frankfurt, where he made a strong impression in the Verdi spinto roles of Manrico and Riccardo.

During the war he sang in a number of German provincial houses, and from 1944 to 1952 he was a member of the Dresden Semperoper, where he developed into a Heldentenor. He first appeared at the Bayreuth Festspielhaus in 1951 as Siegfried in "Der Ring des Nibelungen" under both Knappertsbusch and Karajan, and returned there to repeat the role several times until 1957.

He appeared in Bavarian State Opera Munich between 1950 and 1958 in operas by Weber and Verdi, and in Richard Strauss's Die ägyptische Helena, and sang Siegfried in Götterdämmerung at Covent Garden in 1957. He made his Met debut as Tannhäuser, and also appeared at La Scala, the Paris Opéra and the Opernhaus Zürich.

Aldenhoff was not only one of the last Heldentenors of the period, but also one of the most interesting. Knappertsbusch called him the most "human Heldentenor" of his time.  As an interpreter, he has been called the most precise and sensitive Wagner tenor of his generation although some have found his singing on complete recordings of Weber and Wagner operas in the early 1950s rough and harsh.

He died in Munich on 8 October 1959 at the peak of his career from food poisoning.

Roles 
d’Albert: "Tiefland", Pedro
Beethoven: "Fidelio", Florestan
Flotow: "Martha", Lyonel
Kienzl: "Der Evangelimann", Matthias
Offenbach: "Hoffmanns Erzählungen", Hoffmann
Pfitzner: "Der arme Heinrich", Heinrich
Puccini: "La Bohème", Rudolfo
Puccini "Madame Butterfly", Pinkerton
Strauss: "Salome", Herodes
Strauss: "Elektra", Ägisth
Strauss: "Ariadne auf Naxos", Bacchus
Strauss: "Arabella", Matteo
Strauss: "Die ägyptische Helena", Menelaos
Verdi: "Il Trovatore", Manrico
Verdi: "Un ballo in maschera", Riccardo
Verdi: "Otello", Otello
Wagner: "Der fliegende Holländer", Erik
Wagner: "Tannhäuser", Tannhäuser
Wagner: "Lohengrin", Lohengrin
Wagner: "Meistersinger von Nürnberg", Walther von Stolzing
Wagner: "Tristan und Isolde", Tristan
Wagner: "Walküre", Siegmund
Wagner: "Siegfried", Siegfried
Wagner: "Götterdämmerung", Siegfried
Wagner: "Parsifal", Parsifal
Wagner (Siegfried) "Der Heidenkönig", Radoma
Wagner-Régeny: "Der Günstling", Fabiano
Weber: "Der Freischütz", Max

Discography 
D'Albert: Tiefland – Orchestra of the NDR, Rudolf Alberth, 1953
Beethoven: Ninth Symphony – Gewandhausorchester Leipzig, Hermann Abendroth, 1950
Beethoven: Fidelio – Staatskapelle Dresden, Joseph Keilberth, 1948
Pfitzner: Die Rose vom Liebesgarten – Symphonieorchester of the Bayerische Rundfunk, Robert Heger, 1953
Strauss: Salome – Staatskapelle Dresden, Joseph Keilberth, 1948
Strauss: Elektra – Bayerische Staatsoper, Hans Knappertsbusch 1956
Strauss: Die ägyptische Helena – Bayerische Staatsoper, Joseph Keilberth, 1956 
Wagner: Der fliegende Holländer – Orchester of the NDR, Wilhelm Schüchter, 1951
Wagner: Die Meistersinger von Nürnberg – Sächsische Staatskapelle Dresden, Rudolf Kempe, 1951
Wagner: Siegfried – Bayreuther Festspiele, Herbert von Karajan, 1951
Wagner: Siegfried – Bayreuther Festspiele, Joseph Keilberth, 1952
Wagner: Siegfried – Bayreuther Festspiele, Hans Knappertsbusch 1957
Wagner: Siegfried – Opernhaus Zürich, Robert F. Denzler 1959
Wagner: Götterdämmerung – Bayreuther Festspiele, Knappertsbusch, 1951
Wagner: Götterdämmerung – Bayerische Staatsoper, Hans Knappertsbusch, 1955
Wagner: Parsifal – Sinfonieorchester of the Kölner Rundfunk, Richard Kraus, 1949
Weber: Der Freischütz – Sächsischer Staatskapelle Dresden, Rudolf Kempe, 1949
Lebendige Vergangenheit – Bernd Aldenhoff (Aufnahmen 1946–1949)
Waldoper Zoppot – Das Bayreuth des Nordens und seine Sänger
"A Portrait of Marianne Schech" - Highlights of the 2. act Parsifal,  Orchester der Bayerischen Staatsoper, Eugen Jochum
"Georg Hann Arias 1942-43 Recordings" - Highlights of Rheingold
"Leonie Rysanek sings Beethoven/Wagner/Verdi" - Highlights of Aida
"Josef Metternich - Rare and Unreleased Recordings" - Highlights of Otello

Audio examples 
  Richard Wagner: 2. Act Götterdämmerung
Brünnhilde: Astrid Varnay; Siegfried: Bernd Aldenhoff; Hagen: Ludwig Weber; Alberich: Heinrich Pflanzl; Gunther: Hermann Uhde; Gutrune: Martha Mödl;
Dirigent: Hans Knappertsbusch Festspielhaus; Bayreuth, 04. August 1951
  Richard Wagner: Schmiedelied aus 1. Act Siegfried
Siegfried: Bernd Aldenhoff; Mime: Paul Kuën; Dirigent: Joseph Keilberth; Festspielhaus Bayreuth, 14. August 1952
  Richard Wagner, Siegfried 1. Act: „He, Mime! Geschwind! Wie heißt das Schwert?“
Siegfried: Bernd Aldenhoff; Mime: Paul Kuën; Dirigent: Joseph Keilberth; Festspielhaus Bayreuth, 14. August 1952
  Richard Wagner, Siegfried 1. Act: „Hoho! Hoho! Hohei!“
Siegfried: Bernd Aldenhoff; Mime: Paul Kuën; Dirigent: Joseph Keilberth; Festspielhaus Bayreuth, 14. August 1952
  Richard Wagner: Der fliegende Holländer - 1. act
  Richard Wagner: Der fliegende Holländer - 2. act
  Richard Wagner: Der fliegende Holländer - 3. act
Daland: Kurt Böhme, Senta: Helene Werth, Erik: Bernd Aldenhoff, Mary: Res Fischer, Steuermann: Helmut Krebs, Holländer: Hans Hotter - Chor und Sinfonieorchester des Norddeutschen Rundfunks - Wilhelm Schüchter - Hamburg 1951

External links 
German biography with many pictures

1908 births
1959 deaths
People from Duisburg
Heldentenors
German operatic tenors
20th-century German male opera singers